Alinea lanceolata, the Barbados skink, is a species of skink found in Barbados.

References

lanceolata
Reptiles described in 1863
Reptiles of Barbados
Endemic fauna of Barbados
Taxa named by Edward Drinker Cope